is Italian for 'Holy Cross' and may refer to:

 Santa Croce (Venice), one of the six  (districts) of Venice, Italy.
 The Pontifical University of the Holy Cross in Rome, Italy.
 Many churches, including:
 Santa Croce, Florence, built 1294–1385 and the burial place of several notable Italians
 Santa Croce della Foce, Gubbio, Umbria, built in the 13th century
 Basilica di Santa Croce (Lecce), built 1549–1646
 Santa Croce, Parma, built 1222–1666
 Santa Croce, Padua, built 1737–1749
 Santa Croce in Fossabanda, Pisa, built 1325–19th century
 Santa Croce e San Bonaventura alla Pilotta, Rome, built 1625–19th century
 Santa Croce in Gerusalemme, Rome, consecrated around 325
 Santa Croce alla Lungara, Rome, consecrated 1619
 Santa Croce degli Armeni, Venice, built 13th century, consecrated 1688
 Santa Croce in Via Flaminia, Rome, built 1913, consecrated 1981

People
 House of Santacroce, a noble Roman family. To this belongs among others:
 Prospero Santacroce, 16th-century cardinal
 Fabiano Santacroce (born 1986), Italian-Brazilian football player
 Isabella Santacroce (born 1970), Italian novelist
 Girolamo Santacroce, a 16th-century Italian sculptor and painter

Places
 Santa Croce sull'Arno, town in Tuscany
 Santa Croce Camerina, town in Sicily

Villages 
 Santa Croce di Magliano, a commune in Campobasso, Molise
 Santa Croce di Roccaromana, a commune in Caserta, Campania
 Santa Croce del Sannio, a commune in Benevento, Campania

See also
 Santa Cruz (disambiguation)
 Sainte-Croix (disambiguation)
 Holy Cross (disambiguation)